In mathematics, the notion of a cyclic and separating vector is important in the theory of von Neumann algebras, and in particular in Tomita–Takesaki theory. A related notion is that of a vector which is cyclic for a given operator. The existence of cyclic vectors is guaranteed by the Gelfand–Naimark–Segal (GNS) construction.

Definitions 
Given a Hilbert space H and a linear space A of bounded linear operators in H, an element Ω of H is said to be cyclic for A if the linear space AΩ = {aΩ: a ∈ A} is norm-dense in H. The element Ω is said to be separating if aΩ = 0 with a in A implies a = 0.

 Any element Ω of H defines a semi-norm p on A by p(a) = ||aΩ||. Saying that Ω is separating is equivalent with saying that p is actually a norm.
 If Ω is cyclic for A then it is separating for the commutant A′, which is the von Neumann algebra of all bounded operators in H which commute with all operators of A. Indeed, if a belongs to A′ and satisfies aΩ = 0 then one has for all b in A that 0 = baΩ = abΩ. Because the set of bΩ with b in A is dense in H this implies that a vanishes on a dense subspace of H. By continuity this implies that a vanishes everywhere. Hence, Ω is separating for A′.

The following stronger result holds if A is a *-algebra (an algebra which is closed under taking adjoints) and contains the identity operator 1. For a proof, see Proposition 5 of Part I, Chapter 1 of.

Proposition If A is a *-algebra of  bounded linear operators in H and 1 belongs to A then Ω is cyclic for A if and only if it is separating for the commutant A′.

A special case occurs when A is a von Neumann algebra. Then a vector Ω which is cyclic and separating for A is also cyclic and separating for the commutant A′

Positive linear functionals 
A positive linear functional ω on a *-algebra A is said to be faithful if ω(a) = 0, where a is a positive element of A, implies a = 0.

Every element Ω of H defines a positive linear functional ωΩ on a  *-algebra  A of  bounded linear operators in H by the relation ωΩ(a) = (aΩ,Ω) for all a in A. If ωΩ is defined in this way and A is a C*-algebra then ωΩ is faithful if and only if the vector Ω is separating for A. Note that a von Neumann algebra is a special case of a C*-algebra.

Proposition Let φ and ψ be elements of H which are cyclic for A. Assume that ωφ = ωψ. Then there exists an isometry U in the commutant A′ such that φ = Uψ.

References 

Linear operators
Operator theory